Julia is a fictional character in George Orwell's 1949 dystopian novel Nineteen Eighty-Four. Her last name is not revealed in the novel but she is called Dixon in the 1954 BBC TV production.

Julia was born in 1958 in Oceania, the super-state combining North America, South America, Southern Africa, Australia, New Zealand, and the British Isles (renamed Airstrip One). Her knowledge of events before the revolution is inaccurate as her grandfather, the only close source to her with that knowledge, disappeared when she was eight. Julia integrated herself into the daily life of Oceania early, becoming an especially zealous propagandist for the Junior Anti-Sex League, the Two Minutes Hate and Community Centre. She secretly despises the Party and wants to join the Brotherhood, purportedly an outlawed organization founded by Emmanuel Goldstein. She had her first affair with a Party member at the age of sixteen.

Fictional character history

Julia first appears in Nineteen Eighty-Four at the age of 26, an enthusiastic participant in the Two Minutes Hate directed against Emmanuel Goldstein, a Party co-founder who claims the Revolution was betrayed. At one point, she flings a Newspeak dictionary at the telescreen.  Winston Smith, a fellow worker in the Ministry of Truth, is both aroused by Julia's beauty and disgusted by her fervour.  He recalls that women, especially those Julia's age, are among the most fanatical members of the Party.  He fantasises about raping and murdering her, and fears that she is a member of the Thought Police prepared to denounce him.

After an unspecified amount of time (after Winston leaves a store), Winston spots Julia walking past him. Their gazes meet and Winston, thinking that she is spying on him, contemplates murdering her with a cobblestone. His fear keeps him from doing this.

Four days later, Winston bumps into Julia on her way from the Fiction Department and receives a small paper from her. In his cubicle at work, he unfolds the note and reads what Julia wrote: "I love you." Winston makes arrangements with Julia to meet in the crowd at Victory Square. Winston finds in Julia a fellow thoughtcriminal (as well as a sex criminal); they decide to live life to the fullest while dodging the Party whenever possible.  Over the next several months, they arrange to meet and have recreational sex – something forbidden by the Party – in a variety of places outside London. The lovers know fully well that they will soon be detected and arrested, and Julia observes that "everybody always confesses. You can't help it."

Like Winston, Julia is a smoker. During the affair between them, Julia ambiguously acquires goods such as "real" coffee (the 'victory coffee' is of poor quality and is intended to keep the expectations of the Proles reduced as much as possible so that they do not experience pleasure, which would eventually result in acquiring higher intelligence levels, an outcome not desirable to the Inner Party as it would be contrary to the principles of ingsoc). She also acquires tea, bread and milk, these being theoretically only available to the Inner Party members (as opposed to the lower-quality "Victory" brand products consumed by Outer Party members and Proles) - luxuries which seem to heighten the forbidden feelings induced in them by their affair.

When Inner Party member O'Brien drops a hint that he is a member of the mysterious anti-Party Brotherhood, Winston and Julia come to meet him. O'Brien tests their loyalty by asking whether she and Winston are prepared to separate and never see each other again; Julia shouts "No!". Winston agrees with a heavy heart. Days later, when Winston and Julia are staying in the room above Mr Charrington's shop and have read parts of Goldstein's book, they are arrested by the Thought Police.  Charrington, as it turns out, is a Thought Police agent.

O'Brien is really a Party member and torturer for the Thought Police. While interrogating Winston, O'Brien claims that Julia caved in immediately to the Party's pressure: "She betrayed you, Winston. Immediately – unreservedly. I have seldom seen anyone come over to us so promptly. You would hardly recognise her if you saw her. All her rebelliousness, her deceit, her folly, her dirty-mindedness – everything has been burned out of her. It was a perfect conversion, a textbook case."

During months of torture and brainwashing, Winston surrenders intellectually, but strives to keep his innermost heart inviolate: He knows he will eventually be killed, but secretly he intends to continue hating Big Brother and loving Julia, the only thing keeping him from reverting to a mindlessly loyal Party member. One tiny victory he reserves for his moment of death: The Party could not change his feelings and make him betray Julia in his heart. However, Winston's resolve to continue loving Julia is burned away when he finally enters Room 101. O'Brien threatens to let rats devour Winston's face, and in utter desperation he begs O'Brien, "Do it to Julia!"

Julia is seen one last time in the novel, when she meets Winston after they have both been reintegrated into Oceania society and restored to orthodox thought. They agree nothing – not even sex – matters any more, because their feelings for each other are gone. Julia explains to Winston that "sometimes...they threaten you with something – something you can't stand up to, can't even think about. And then you say, 'Don't do it to me, do it to somebody else, do it to so-and-so.' ... And after that, you don't feel the same towards the other person any longer". It is also suggested that she has been given a lobotomy ("...and there was a long scar, partly hidden by the hair, across her forehead and temple...").

As the novel closes, Winston discovers that his love for Julia has been replaced by love for Big Brother – the only form of love that is approved by the Party.

Portrayals in other media
The United States Steel Hour: "1984", radio adaptation from 1953. Marian  Seldes
Studio One: "1984", television adaptation from 1953: Norma Crane
Nineteen Eighty-Four, television adaptation from 1954: Yvonne Mitchell
Nineteen Eighty-Four, radio adaptation from 1965. Sylvia Syms
1984, film adaptation directed by Michael Anderson in 1956: Jan Sterling
Theatre 625: "The World of George Orwell: 1984", television adaptation from 1965: Jane Merrow
Nineteen Eighty-Four, radio adaptation from 1967. Diana Olsson
Nineteen Eighty-Four, film adaptation directed by Michael Radford in 1984: Suzanna Hamilton
Actresses who have played Julia in the 2013 Stage Adaptation have included Hara Yannas, Catrin Stewart, Olivia Wilde, and Ursula Mills.
1984! The Musical! 2020 Musical: Anna Della Marta
 The Real George Orwell: Nineteen Eighty-Four, radio adaptation from 2013. Pippa Nixon

References 
General references
 
Inline citations

Nineteen Eighty-Four characters
Fictional civil servants
Literary characters introduced in 1949
Fictional revolutionaries
Fictional lobotomised people
Female characters in literature